Dolores Evelyn Cross (born August 29, 1938) is an educator and university administrator who became the first female and first African-American president of Chicago State University (1990) and the first female president of Morris Brown College (MBC) (1998–2002). In 2006, she pleaded guilty to one count of embezzlement in connection with the misapplication of federal funds provided to MBC.

Early life 
Dolores Cross was born in Newark, New Jersey, and grew up in public housing there.  After receiving her Bachelor of Science in Education from Seton Hall University in 1963, Cross obtained her Master of Science in education from Hofstra University and a Ph.D. in higher education  from the University of Michigan in 1971.  In 2001 Seton Hall awarded her an honorary degree, Doctor of Humane Letters.

Career 
Cross is a former professor and university administrator who served as vice chancellor for student affairs at City University of New York and the president of the New York State Higher Education Services Corporation before becoming the first female president of Chicago State University in 1990.  Cross moved from the presidency of Chicago State in 1997 to the presidency of the GE Fund, a non-profit wing of General Electric.  Shortly after that, she accepted the position as the first female president of Morris Brown College.

Morris Brown College tenure 
When Cross arrived at Morris Brown College, it was financially troubled. While she was President, Morris Brown College obtained $3.4 million in federally insured student loans and Pell grants in the names of ineligible students, including some who never attended the college, some who were enrolled part-time and others who had already left.  The money was used to pay the school's operating costs.

As with all such loans, the responsibility for paying back the loans fell on the students.  Due to its ongoing financial issues, the school eventually lost its accreditation from the Southern Association of Colleges and Schools. After the loss of accreditation, MBC students became ineligible for many government grants and loans. The school nearly closed in 2003 as its enrollment dropped.. The school faced foreclosure in 2012, and went through bankruptcy in 2014.

In May 2006, Cross pleaded guilty to a charge of embezzlement stemming from her time at the college. Federal prosecutors dismissed 27 other charges against her in exchange for her plea.

On January 3, 2007, Cross was sentenced to five years of probation and a year of home confinement for her role in fraudulently obtaining millions of dollars in federal student aid for the college. In addition, the college’s financial-aid director at the time the fraud was committed was also sentenced, to five years of probation and 18 months of home confinement. The prosecutors and her lawyers agreed to a plea bargain. The light sentence meted out by the judge was based on her age (70), her medical condition (she suffered from sleep apnea and had a series of transient ischemic attacks or small strokes) and the fact that she did not profit personally from the crime.

References 

Heads of universities and colleges in the United States
Living people
African-American academics
Hofstra University alumni
Seton Hall University alumni
University of Michigan alumni
Morris Brown College
Year of birth missing (living people)
21st-century African-American people